Desh Premik is a 1994 Bangladeshi film starring Manna and Champa opposite him. Director Kazi Hayat garnered Bangladesh National Film Award for Best Director. It also stars Alamgir.

Track listing 
"Momo Chittey" - Rezwana Chowdhury Banya
"Tumi Ki Dekhecho Kobhu" - Mahmudunnabi
"Sonkotero Bihbolotay" - N/A

Awards 
Bangladesh National Film Awards
Best Film - Sheikh Mujibur Rahman
Best Actor - Alamgir
Best Director - Kazi Hayat
Best Screenplay - Kazi Hayat

References

1994 films
1990s Bengali-language films
Bengali-language Bangladeshi films
Films scored by Azad Rahman
Films scored by Ahmed Imtiaz Bulbul
Best Film National Film Award (Bangladesh) winners
Films whose writer won the Best Screenplay National Film Award (Bangladesh)